Stefania Ferrario (born Stephanie Denise Kightley; 14 June 1993) is an Australian model and activist. She is known for various efforts to raise awareness on subjects including body positivity, animal cruelty, and veganism.

Biography 
Ferrario was born in Canberra, Australia to an Italian mother and English father. She is currently the face of a lingerie line by Dita Von Teese for Australian department store Myer, and has previously worked with Gok Wan for Target (Australia) and other Australian brands such as Sportsgirl, City Chic, Bras N Things and Berlei, overseas she has worked for Italian stores Fiorella Rubino, Flow clothing in Malaysia and Swimsuits For All.

In 2012 Ferrario shaved her hair off to raise money and awareness for cancer, alopecia and trichotillomania. She then grabbed the attention of fashion photographer Peter Coulson who photographed Ferrario for his book In My Pants, a charitable publication to raise money and awareness for cancer and the Cancer Council (Australia).

In February 2015, Ferrario started a campaign with television presenter Ajay Rochester to end the use of the term "plus size" to describe models who are above a US dress size 4 by the modelling industry. Ferrario posted a picture with the caption "I am a model FULL STOP" with the hashtag "#droptheplus" which gained coverage in the media and was heavily discussed, with mixed, but mostly positive reactions, on social media and within the fashion industry.

In 2017 Stefania was amongst the four faces of Melbourne Fashion Week.

In an interview with Fuse magazine, Ferrario stated that she is tri-lingual, speaking English, French, and Italian and identifies herself as bisexual.

Ferrario is a vegan and describes herself as an "animal-activist", telling another animal activist she had been vegan since 1 January 2020 and that she wishes she had done it sooner. Later that year, she tweeted "If you’re against animal cruelty why are you paying for it on a daily basis? Go vegan!" She has a highlights section on her Instagram for all posts about vegan food and discussion and created a YouTube video showing the food she would eat on a normal day and the vegan food she bought that day.

Ferrario has pierced nipples and a rabbit called Bambi.

Other honors
Stefania Ferrario Wins ‘The PWI Most Beautiful Woman In The World’ Award 2020.

References

External links 
 
 
 #droptheplus website

1993 births
Living people
Australian animal rights activists
Australian female models
Models from Melbourne
Australian people of English descent
Australian people of Italian descent
Australian veganism activists
People from Canberra
Australian bisexual people
Bisexual women
LGBT models
IMG Models models